The 1983–84 Hong Kong First Division League season was the 73rd since its establishment.

League table

References
1983–84 Hong Kong First Division table (RSSSF)

Hong
Hong Kong First Division League seasons
1983–84 in Hong Kong football